Richard Corbould (1757 in London – 1831 in London) was an English artist, sometimes misspelt "Corbold" .

He was a painter, in oil and watercolour, of portraits, landscape, and occasionally history; of porcelain, and miniatures on ivory, and enamels; and was furthermore an important illustrator of books renowned for his Napoleonic sketches of Ships, and a follower of the old masters. From 1777 to 1811 he was a constant contributor to the Royal Academy. He died at Highgate, north London, in 1831. Of his works exhibited at the Royal Academy may be noticed:

1793. Cottagers gathering Sticks.
1802. Eve caressing Adam's Flock and The Archangel Michael.
1806. Ulysses's Descent into Hades.
1806. View at Hampstead. (In the South Kensington Museum.)

References
 

1757 births
1831 deaths
18th-century English painters
English male painters
19th-century English painters
Painters from London
English watercolourists
English portrait painters
English landscape painters
English illustrators
19th-century English male artists
18th-century English male artists